Covingham is a village and civil parish in Wiltshire, England, now part of the built-up area of the Borough of Swindon. It was developed in the 1960s as part of Swindon's eastward expansion towards the A419. St Paul's Church is the main parish church of the village.

Freedom of the Parish
The following people and military units have received the Freedom of the Parish of Covingham.

Individuals
 Councillor Derek J. Benfield: 17 May 2021.

References

External links

Civil parishes in Wiltshire
Villages in Wiltshire
Borough of Swindon